Demon Chaos known in Japan as , is a video game co-developed by Genki and Now Production for the PlayStation 2 (PS2) home game console. The game was published by Genki in Japan on November 24, 2005 and by Konami in PAL regions in 2007.

It is set in feudal Japan in the 16th century and revolves around a priestess who has been given eternal youth until she exterminates all the demons. She has been given charge of a mystical beast from the gods, Inugami, which is controlled by the player.

The game is in the vein of the well-known Dynasty Warriors series, in which the player battles crowd after crowd of hostile enemies. The unique aspect of the game is that up to 65,535 enemies can be on-screen at once.

Reception

Demon Chaos received mostly mediocre reviews, currently holding a 62 out of 100 on Metacritic.

References

2005 video games
Crowd-combat fighting games
Genki (company) games
Hack and slash games
Now Production games
Cancelled GameCube games
PlayStation 2 games
PlayStation Network games
Video games set in feudal Japan
Single-player video games
Video games featuring female protagonists
Video games about demons
Konami beat 'em ups
Video games developed in Japan